The 2007 Senior Bowl was a college football exhibition game featuring players from the 2006 college football season and prospects in the 2007 NFL Draft. The 58th edition of the Senior Bowl was played on January 27, 2007, at Ladd–Peebles Stadium in Mobile, Alabama. Clothing company Under Armour sponsored the event for the first year, and provided apparel for the game. Coverage of the event was in high-definition on the NFL Network. The North team won, 27–0.

Game summary

References

Senior Bowl
Senior Bowl
Senior Bowl
Senior Bowl